Ashley Planes was a historic freight cable railroad situated along three separately powered inclined plane sections located between Ashley, Pennsylvania at the foot, and via the Solomon cutting the yard in Mountain Top over  above and initially built between 1837-38 by Lehigh Coal & Navigation Company's subsidiary Lehigh and Susquehanna Railroad (L&S). One result of  the 1837 updates of omnibus transportation bills called the Main Line of Public Works (1824), the legislation was undertaken with an eye to enhance and better connect eastern settlement's business interests with newer mid-western territories rapidly undergoing population explosions in the Pre-Civil War era. But those manufactories needed a source of heat, and the Northern Pennsylvania Coal Region was barely connected to eastern markets except by pack mule, or only through long and arduous routes down the Susquehanna then overland to Philadelphia.

The Ashley Planes job was to join two railroad sections at either elevation and bridge over the drainage divide between the Susquehanna Valley and that of the Lehigh/Delaware valleys. It was purpose-built to join the freight capacity of two canals (The Pennsylvania Canal System, locally the West Susquehanna Division at Pittston and the Lehigh Canal) and via the Susquehanna, connect to other transportation infrastructure between Philadelphia and Pittsburgh—in intent the Planes role in the legislation was specifically to connect the seaports of the Delaware River with the new interior settlements of the near-midwest along the tributary rivers of the vast Mississippi River drainage basin. More pragmatically, it was designed during the mid-canal era as part of an overall strategic schema to lift heavy freight eastwards out of the Susquehanna Valley in suburban Wilkes-Barre into the eastside descents which gravity aided to the canal head and thence using cheap practical water transport ended feeding much needed coal into all the big coastal cities of the Eastern United States accessible via the Delaware Valley, and indeed to trans-oceanic destinations.
 
This connecting road was an important link that connected Pittsburgh, the Ohio River and the midwest to the eastern coastal cities via the Pennsylvania Canal System and later, other railroads, the shortest path at the time. In the late 1830s, the current mobile steam locomotives were still in the early stages of development and relatively weak and underpowered compared to those available in the 1850s. As a result of this lack of viable rail transport, political planners and businessmen regarded canals and water transport via barges over natural water features as the only pragmatic means of shipping bulk goods. 

The Planes were built in 1837–1838 by the Lehigh Coal & Navigation Company (LC&N) in Luzerne County, Pennsylvania. They were built concurrently with rail lines and an extension of the Lehigh Canal. The Planes were connected by rail to the Pennsylvania Canal sending goods and passengers west and via Mountain Top by rail to White Haven. The Mountain Top to White Haven route also sent Northern Coal Region anthracite down the newly extended Lehigh Canal. The incline railroads were located at Fairview Township and Hanover Township. Before and after loading, coal hoppers would be staged from the Central Railroad of New Jersey's (CNJ) Mountain Top Yard (leased from LH&S from the 1870s) in nearby Mountain Top, Pennsylvania. The three railroads were built in 1837, the 1860s, and 1909, and feature a stationary power source using cable winding and winching and cars traveling down as a counterweight to a car being lifted on parallel tracks. 

It was added to the National Register of Historic Places in 1980.

Operations
The thousand foot lift of the cable railway was not continuous. The initial two and later three sections of the Ashley Planes railroad was capable of operation as a  funicular railroad or a cable railroad, for its hoist houses all used a pusher cart called a 'barney' hooked into a continuous cable in the same way as a modern ski lift uses a continuous cable.
 
Like a ski lift, the railway was operated from a standing engine by an operator in control of a winch, clutch and brake. A helper spotted cars below a short local drop to an area upslope of the 'barney house', where the cable and pusher cart would drop into on one end (heading down) and rise out of on the other to engage the freight cars and push them upwards. The axle on the barneys telescoped so that at the barney house entrance the barney's wheels slide inside and dropped under the plane of the standard width railroad tracks so the barney could slide away and let gravity take the consist onto the marshaling yard. When using funicular action, as it did sending returns down during its early years the rails split connecting two  pairs of tracks bulging out in a vase-like shape in a passing area, so the railway could ship freight downhill east to west as well as the heavy operations west to east which predominated until its closing. In the earliest years of operation, there was no back track to return cars to the bottom for refilling, and they had to be returned on the Planes, thus slowing and complicating the lift operations. When stopping cars from rolling free, the barneys had to be positioned below the cars, and since the upsides are uphills from the barney house opening, that meant a latch (brake system) had to hold a string of empties above the barney before it emerged from hiding its little tunnel. It also means the barney was moving down hill and away from the latched cars which would then accelerate and bang into the small barneys with considerable force, part of which was transmitted via the cables to everything in the system. It was actually easier to lift cars waiting at a latch for a barney than it was to drop cars down safely onto a moving barney. In the 1860s, the LH&S completed tracks along the right bank of the Lehigh through the Lehigh Gorge to Mauch Chunk (now Jim Thorpe, PA) and its trackage to the Delaware Valley, especially the Delaware Canal to Philadelphia markets and rail connections at Easton via the industrial centers of Allentown and Bethlehem, Pennsylvania.
 
These inclined plane railbeds were used for the transportation of anthracite coal. The railroads were in use until 1948.

See also 
 Lehigh Coal and Navigation Company Records in  Beyond Steel: An Archive of Lehigh Valley Industry and Culture.
 Early Mining Pictures – Anthracite Mining pictorial: Mines & Structures operated by the L.C.& N., Summit Hill, Lansford and Coaldale, Pennsylvania—the heartland of the company that designed, built and ran the Planes until the 1930s.
 Switch-Back Gravity Railroad: Proprietary photos touring the LC&N built Summit Hill & Mauch Chunk Railroad, the 2nd railway in North America—and the cable railroad which antedated the completion of the Ashley Planes with very nearly the same design and technologies. Due to its many years as a tourist attraction, the photo history of the older railway is far more complete.
 List of funicular railways

Notes

References

Industrial buildings and structures on the National Register of Historic Places in Pennsylvania
Transportation buildings and structures in Luzerne County, Pennsylvania
National Register of Historic Places in Luzerne County, Pennsylvania